Peter Lasersohn is a professor of linguistics at the University of Illinois at Urbana-Champaign.

Education
Ph.D. in Linguistics: Ohio State University, 1988
M.A. in Linguistics: Ohio State University, 1985
B.A. in German, French: Earlham College, 1981

Fellowships and honours
Alumni Discretionary-Support Award, University of Illinois, 1999
Presidential Fellow, Ohio State University, 1987
LSA Tuition Fellowship, Linguistic Institute, Stanford University, 1987
LSA Tuition Fellowship, Linguistic Institute, City University of New York, 1986
Inducted Phi Kappa Phi National Honor Society, Ohio State University, 1984
University Fellow, Ohio State University 1982
Arthur Charles Fellow for Language Study, Earlham College, 1981

External links
Peter Lasersohn homepage

Linguists from the United States
Earlham College alumni
Ohio State University faculty
Living people
Year of birth missing (living people)